Sharp 'N' Smart (foaled 28 September 2019) is New Zealand racehorse which has won at Group One level in both New Zealand and Australia.

Background

Sharp 'N' Smart was bred by Gerry Harvey and is a son of Westbury Stud stallion Redwood. 

Bought by New Zealand Racing Hall of Fame inductee Graeme Rogerson for $55,000 at the 2021 New Zealand Bloodstock National Yearling Sale at Karaka, Sharp 'N' Smart is raced by Rogerson in partnership with a syndicate that includes Harvey, Merv Butterworth, Craig Leishman and Todd Bawden.

Racing career

Sharp 'N' Smart made a promising start to his career as an autumn two-year-old, winning at Listed level in New Zealand before a Queensland campaign that produced a second in the Listed The Phoenix and a fourth in the Group One J. J. Atkins.

The gelding took a big step forward in the spring of his three-year-old season, scoring back-to-back Group wins in Sydney in the Gloaming Stakes and the Group One Spring Champion Stakes. He then lined up in the Group One Victoria Derby after only a seven-day turnaround, finishing second behind Manzoice.

Sharp 'N' Smart resumed in the summer with a second placing in the Thorndon Mile, then scored a rare victory by a three-year-old against older horses in the weight-for-age Herbie Dyke Stakes.

Sharp 'N' Smart was rated a $1.40 favourite for the 2023 New Zealand Derby, which was run at Te Rapa Racecourse. Confidently ridden by Ryan Elliot, Sharp 'N' Smart launched a powerful run approaching the home turn and was too strong down the straight, scoring by a long neck.

See also

 2023 New Zealand Derby

References 

Racehorses bred in New Zealand
Racehorses trained in New Zealand
2019 racehorse births